William Everhart House is a historic home located in West Whiteland Township, Chester County, Pennsylvania. It was built about 1810, and is a two-story, five bay, brick Federal style dwelling with a gable roof.  It measures 50 feet by 21 feet, and features two entrances, one with a fanlight.  It was the home of Congressman William Everhart (1785-1868), who also built the William Everhart Buildings in West Chester.

It was listed on the National Register of Historic Places in 1984.

References

Houses on the National Register of Historic Places in Pennsylvania
Federal architecture in Pennsylvania
Houses completed in 1810
Houses in Chester County, Pennsylvania
National Register of Historic Places in Chester County, Pennsylvania